Liwaa’ Fursan al-Joulan is a Free Syrian Army faction based in Jubata al-Khashab, a Quneitra town in the United Nations Disengagement Observer Force (UNDOF) zone. It consists of 300-1000 local fighters and is led by Abu Suhaib al-Joulani. The group was alleged to receive Israeli assistance of cash, ammunition and other forms of aid. It is described as a "local" rebel group, "non-Islamist" and independent of the Southern Front (the main Free Syrian Army group in the area).

Israel did admit of providing humanitarian aid to Syrians in coordination with the group, including water pumps, medical supplies and cash for fuel. A bakery was built in the group's town with the help of Israel. It allegedly feeds 60k people in rebel-held areas in southwestern Syria.

In August 2017, sources told the pro-government/pro-Hezbollah Al Mayadeen that the group was driven out of its stronghold in Jubata al-Khashab after it was accused of collaborating with the Israeli army. 

On 19 July 2018, violent clashes erupted in Qahtaniyah region after the group rejected the deal of evacuation to Idlib of which the opposition reached with the Syrian government. Syrian activists circulated a voice recording which was sent by a Russian officer to the group, in which he threateningly told them: "I warn you if you do not stop shooting at the bulldozer, we will strike at your positions. We agreed with the Israelis. I personally will ride this turquoise and move it. I just spoke with Tel Aviv. I ask you very quickly to stop the shooting". A military source told Al Modon that the group's leader, Abu Suhaib, hopes to reach an agreement with the Russian side, similar to the agreement that was concluded by the former leader of the opposition factions in Beit Jann, Ayad Kamal, nicknamed "Moro", after an Israeli insistence on his survival as a local force that ensures the protection of the borders.

On 21 July 2018, Al Quds Al Arabi reported that after negotiation with Israel, the group and two other militias joined to form the Israeli-led Army of the South on the southern border of Syria in the demilitarized zone in order to ensure the removal of Iranian forces. The army is expected to have around 2,000 members.

On 22 July 2018, it was reported that the group will remain in the region with an understanding between Russia and Israel to act as a border guard force. Haaretz reported that the group coordinated with Israel the evacuation of 800 White Helmets members. In addition, pro-government sources reported that two commanders of the group, Moaz Nassar and Abu Rateb, fled to Israel.

References

Anti-government factions of the Syrian civil war
Guerrilla organizations
Arab militant groups